Scott Kuggeleijn (born 3 January 1992) is a New Zealand international cricketer. He plays first-class cricket for Northern Districts.

Domestic and T20 career
In the 2016–17 Ford Trophy, Kuggeleijn took the most wickets in the tournament, with seventeen dismissals in nine matches. In June 2018, he was awarded a contract with Northern Districts for the 2018–19 season. In March 2019, he was called up to the Chennai Super Kings as a replacement for injured South Africa's Lungi Ngidi in the 2019 Indian Premier League (IPL). On 27 April 2021, he was signed by the Royal Challengers Bangalore as a replacement for Kane Richardson during the 2021 Indian Premier League.

International career
In April 2017, he was named in New Zealand's One Day International (ODI) squad for the 2017 Ireland Tri-Nation Series. He made his ODI debut for New Zealand against Ireland on 14 May 2017. He scored 11 runs in the match and dismissed William Porterfield for his first ODI wicket.

In January 2019, he was named in New Zealand's Twenty20 International (T20I) squad for the one-off T20I against Sri Lanka. He made his T20I debut in that match against Sri Lanka on 11 January 2019.

In February 2023, he was named in New Zealand's Test squad for their series against England. He made his Test debut on 16 February 2023, for New Zealand against England.

Sexual assault accusation
Kuggeleijn went on trial for rape in 2016, and again in 2017 after a hung jury in the first trial. He was not convicted. When Kuggeleijn was nearly selected for the national team just after the second trial in 2017, New Zealand Cricket chief executive David White said they "respected the court process and were not in the business of relitigating past events". That, he said, "would be manifestly unfair on all parties involved. The court is the most appropriate forum for judging matters as serious as this". The position New Zealand Cricket took was criticised publicly and in the media. Kuggeleijn avoided talking about the subject in a rare press conference in December 2020 stating "I'm just trying to focus on my cricket."

References

External links
 

1992 births
Living people
New Zealand cricketers
New Zealand Test cricketers
New Zealand One Day International cricketers
New Zealand Twenty20 International cricketers
Northern Districts cricketers
Wellington cricketers
Cricketers from Hamilton, New Zealand
Chennai Super Kings cricketers